Živojin "Žika" Milenković (: 26 January 1928 - 18 March 2008) was a Serbian actor. He appeared in more than one hundred films from 1959 to 2004.

Selected filmography

References

External links 

1928 births
2008 deaths
Actors from Niš
Serbian male film actors